Egypt–Syria relations refers to the bilateral relations between the Arab Republic of Egypt and the Syrian Arab Republic. Egypt has an embassy in Damascus. Syria has an embassy in Cairo.

Both countries were members of the Arab League, but as of November 2011, Syria has been suspended from the League due to its failure to follow up with an agreement concerning its current civil war. Relations were generally well under the reign of Hosni Mubarak, but were strained after the election of Muslim Brotherhood member Mohamed Morsi. Egypt closed down its embassy in Damascus in June 2013. However, relations were restored a month later, and the embassies in both countries were reopened at that time.

History of relations

Pre-20th century 
During the New Kingdom of Ancient Egypt, the Nineteenth Dynasty of Egypt occupied parts of southern Syria and fought wars against the local Levantine groups. Eventually, Egypt would fall to the Assyrian Empire in 673 BC. Egypt and Syria would later be provinces of the Roman and Byzantine empire, before the Islamic conquests. Egypt and Syria would remain important lands of the early caliphates, such as the Rashidun, Umayyad, Abbasid, Fatmid, and Ottoman caliphate. During the times of the Ottoman Empire, Napoleon invaded Egypt and Syria. After Napoleon was defeated, a power vacuum emerged in Egypt, and Ottoman general Muhammad Ali Pasha took control of Egypt and declared war on the Ottomans for control over Syria. Though he was successful, Syrian peasants revolted against Egyptian occupation. After the Second Egyptian-Ottoman war, Egypt withdrew from Syria in returned for recognition of Muhammad Ali's dynasty's rule over Egypt

Relations before the 1958 merger 
British influence in Egyptian affairs grew over time, so by 1914, Britain was able to replace the pro-Ottoman Khedive of Egypt Abbas II with the pro-British Hussein Kamel, who declared Egypt independent from the Ottomans and allied with the British, joining World War One against the Ottomans, with assistance from Syrian rebels. During the war, the British and the French colluded to divide Ottoman ruled Arab lands. Syria was agreed to become a French mandate, despite later conflict between French forces and Syrian rebels.
The Syrian and Egyptian governments post-WWI retained positive relations. Syria and Egypt were signers of the Alexandria Protocols and later founders of the Arab League. Both nations participated in the 1948 war against Israel, but would suffer a defeat to Israel. This defeat would leave shock-waves in Egyptian and Syrian politics, as well as Arab politics as a whole. The following year, three coups occurred in Syria: one in March by Husni al-Za'im, one in August by Sami al-Hinnawi, and a final one in December by Adib Shishakli. In 1952, the Egyptian monarchy was overthrown in a coup by a conspiracy of Egyptian officers, declaring the Egyptian Republic, with its first president Muhammad Naguib. That year, Shishakli founded the Arab Liberation Movement, a political party that espoused Pan-Arab nationalism. Shishakli meet with Naguib to discuss cooperation and a union between Syria and Egypt, which Naguib was receptive to but wanted to resolve the issue of Sudan, which Egypt had occupied since the conquests of Muhammad Ali, first. Talks between the Syrian and the Egyptian governments over unification continued even after Shishakli's overthrow in 1954 and Naguib's overthrow that same year by Gamal Abdel Nasser. The extent at which the 1952 Egyptian coup was inspired by the recent Syrian coups is not fully understood but highly speculated.

United Arab Republic 
Pan-Arab sentiment was traditionally very strong in Syria, and Nasser was a popular hero-figure throughout the Arab world following the Suez War of 1956. There was thus considerable popular support in Syria for union with Nasser's Egypt. The Arab Socialist Ba'ath Party was the leading advocate of such a union.

On 1 February 1958, a group of political and military leaders in Syria proposed a merger of the two states to Egyptian President Gamal Abdel Nasser. One of the major reasons for this union was worry over the growing influence of the Syrian Communist Party, under the leadership of Khalid Bakdash.

Thus, on 22 February 1958, the United Arab Republic was formed, uniting Syria and Egypt as one nation. Under this union, all parties in Syria were banned, and a massive crackdown on both Syrian communists and Syrian political life as a whole commenced. Syrian elites felt sidelined over perceived Egyptian domination of Syrian,  affairs, with Egyptian filling out top Syrian political positions. However, the Egyptian government argued that strict management of Syrian affairs was necessary due to Syrian political chaos. By 1961, Syria was centralized into one province, and Nasser sent his vice president, Abdel Hakim Amer, to be the governor of Syria. This caused a crisis with Abdel Hamid al-Sarraj, one of the last Syrians to hold power in the UAR, resigning as a result. This incident lead many Syrian leaders to believe that Syria was being turned into an Egyptian colony, so a coup d'état in Syria in 1961 arrested Amer, sent him back to Egypt, and declared Syria an independent nation, though Egypt would keep the name 'United Arab Republic' until 1971. In 1963, a Ba'athist coup in Syria overthrew the Syrian government and talks between Egypt and Syria over unification returned, with Syria signing the Cairo Charter, promising an eventual union with Egypt. However, the Ba'athist government in Syria was more concerned over consolidating its rule than speedy unification and fears of a return to Egyptian domination caused Syria to back out of the Cairo Charter.

Nonetheless, relations between Egypt and Syria were cordial after the collapse of the union, and Syria stood by Egypt during the Six-Day War of 1967, which resulted in Egypt losing the Sinai Peninsula and Syria losing the Golan Heights to Israel. After the war, the new Syrian president Hafez al-Assad and Egyptian President Anwar Sadat agreed on a Federation of Arab Republics, a loose organization of political and military unity.

Yom Kippur War
In 1973, Egypt and Syria launched the October War on Israel with a coordinated attack to retake the Sinai Peninsula and the Golan Heights. The 2-week-long war ended with Egypt regaining the east bank of the Suez Canal in Sinai but Syria losing even more territory to Israel, leaving the Israeli army threatening to capture Damascus. After the war, Sadat embarked on a pro-capitalist economic policy, a pro-US foreign policy, and eventual peace treaty with Israel, which contrasted with Syria's pro-USSR foreign policy, socialist economic policy and hard-line stance on the Palestinian cause. After Egyptian president Anwar al-Sadat's peace treaty with Israel in the Camp David Accords, Egypt was expelled from the Arab League. Syria severed diplomatic relations after Sadat's visit to Jerusalem. Relations between Egypt and Syria remained cold for the rest of Sadat's term, especially during Israel's and Syria's proxy conflict in Lebanon.

Under Hosni Mubarak 
After Sadat's assassination in 1981, Hosni Mubarak became president of Egypt. Mubarak tried to balance Egypt's relations with the Arab World with Egypt's relationship with the United States and Israel. Egypt would support Iraq during the Iran-Iraq war, while Syria supported Iran. Egyptian-Syrian relations remained cold until the Gulf War, when both Syria and Egypt sent troops to expel Iraq from Kuwait, furthering the normalization of relations with Syria. During the Palestinian-Israeli peace process, Hosni Mubarak was acted as a mediator. By the 1990s, Syria and Egypt had established positive relations, with Mubarak attempting to resolve the Syrian-Israeli tensions, planning for the return of the Golan Heights to Syria if Syria normalized relations with Israel. Mubarak also cooled tensions between Syria and Turkey in the late 1990s.

Post-Revolution Egypt

2011–2013
After the Arab Spring and the rise of the Muslim Brotherhood, relations became extremely strained. The Muslim Brotherhood is a banned organization and its membership is a capital offense in Syria. Egypt severed all relations with the Syrian Arab Republic in 2013.

Under Egyptian President Mohamed Morsi, who was a member of the Muslim Brotherhood, Egypt supported the Syrian opposition and called on Assad to step down. On 15 June 2013, President Morsi ordered the closing of the Syrian Embassy in Cairo and called for a no-fly zone over Syria.

An estimated 70,000 and 100,000 Syrian refugees were living in the country under Morsi's rule and the government tried to support Syrian refugees by offering residency permits, assistance on finding employment, allowing Syrian refugee children to register in state schools, and access to other public services.

2013–present, Syrian civil war
Diplomatic relations were restored, and the embassies reopened after Morsi was removed from office just weeks later in July 2013. In July 2013, the two countries agreed to reopen the Egyptian consulate in Damascus and the Syrian consulate in Cairo.

In late November 2016, some Arab media outlets reported that Egyptian pilots arrived in mid-November to Syria to help the Syrian government in its fight against the Islamic State and Al Nusra Front. This came after Egyptian President Abdel Fattah el-Sisi publicly stated that he supported the Syrian military in the civil war in Syria. However, several days later, Egypt denied it has a military presence in Syria. However, Egypt was still a vocal supporter for the Russia Intervention and supporter for Bashar al-Assad, the latter of which is alleged by the United States to have sent military aid to, which Egypt denies.

Abdel Fattah el-Sisi said in 2016 that his nation's priority is "supporting national armies", which he said included the Syrian Armed Forces. He also said regarding Egypt's stance in the conflict: "Our stance in Egypt is to respect the will of the Syrian people, and that a political solution to the Syrian crisis is the most suitable way, and to seriously deal with terrorist groups and disarm them,". Egypt's support for a political solution was reaffirmed in February 2017. Egypt's Foreign Ministry spokesperson, Ahmed Abu Zeid, said that Egyptian foreign minister Sameh Shoukry, "during his meeting with UN Special Envoy to Syria, Staffan de Mistura, on Saturday confirmed Egypt's rejection of any military intervention that would violate Syrian sovereignty and undermine opportunities of the standing political solutions.”

Egypt has also expressed great interest in rebuilding postwar Syria, with many Egyptian companies and businessmen discussing investment opportunities in Syria as well as participation in the reconstruction effort. Tarik al-Nabrawi, president of Egypt's Engineers Syndicate said that 2018 will witness a “boom and influential role for Egyptian construction companies in Syria and to open the door for other companies — in the electricity, building material, steel, aluminum, ceramics and sanitary material fields among others — to work in the Syrian market and participate in rebuilding cities and facilities that the war has destroyed.”

On 25 February 2018, Syrian state news reported that an Egyptian delegation composed of "members of the Islamic and Arab Assembly for supporting Resistance and Future Pioneers movement as well as a number of figures", including Jamal Zahran and Farouk Hassan, visited the Syrian consulate in Cairo to express solidarity with the Syrian government.

After the 2023 Turkey–Syria earthquake, Egyptian President Abdel Fattah el-Sisi called his Syrian counterpart for the first time to offer assistance.

See also

 Foreign relations of Egypt
 Foreign relations of Syria
 United Arab Republic

References

External links
 http://english.ahram.org.eg/NewsContent/2/8/63677/World/Region/More-than-,-Syrian-refugees-in-Egypt.aspx

 
Syria
Bilateral relations of Syria